Jean-Baptiste Dominique Rusca (27 November 1759 – 14 February 1814) was born in the County of Nice, part of the Kingdom of Sardinia. By profession a medical doctor, he advocated the cause of the French Revolution and was expelled by the Sardinian authorities. In 1793, he treated the French sick and wounded during the Siege of Toulon and was appointed to command a sapper battalion. He later fought in the Army of Italy and the Army of the Eastern Pyrenees before returning to Italy. By the time of the Montenotte Campaign in 1796, he was a general officer leading major units. He was captured by the Austrians during the 1799 Italian campaign. After commanding garrisons for several years, he led a division in Italy during the 1809 war. He was killed in action at Soissons during the War of the Sixth Coalition. Rusca is one of the names inscribed under the Arc de Triomphe.

Notes

References
 Bowden, Scotty & Tarbox, Charlie. Armies on the Danube 1809. Arlington, Texas: Empire Games Press, 1980.
 Boycott-Brown, Martin. The Road to Rivoli. London: Cassell & Co., 2001. 
 Broughton, Tony. Generals Who Served in the French Army during the Period 1789-1814: Bache to Beysser
  Mullié, Charles. Biographie des célébrités militaires des armées de terre et de mer de 1789 a 1850. 1852.
 Smith, Digby. The Napoleonic Wars Data Book. London: Greenhill, 1998. 

Italian soldiers
French generals
18th-century French physicians
French Republican military leaders of the French Revolutionary Wars
French military personnel killed in the Napoleonic Wars
French commanders of the Napoleonic Wars
1759 births
1814 deaths
Names inscribed under the Arc de Triomphe